Portlock is a surname. Notable people with the surname include:

Jenice Dena Portlock (born 1987), also known as Sabi, is an American pop singer, songwriter, dancer and actress
Joseph Ellison Portlock (1794–1864), British geologist and soldier
Nathaniel Portlock (c. 1748–1817), British ship’s captain, maritime fur traderand author

See also 
Portlock, Alaska, is a ghost town in the U.S. state of Alaska